UFC 219: Cyborg vs. Holm was a mixed martial arts event produced by the Ultimate Fighting Championship held on December 30, 2017, at the T-Mobile Arena in Paradise, Nevada, part of the Las Vegas metropolitan area.

Background
A UFC Women's Featherweight Championship bout between current champion Cris Cyborg (who is also a former Strikeforce Women's Featherweight Champion and Invicta FC Featherweight Champion) and former UFC Women's Bantamweight Champion Holly Holm headlined this event.

Former WEC Bantamweight Champion and two time UFC Bantamweight Champion Dominick Cruz was scheduled to face Jimmie Rivera at the event. However, Cruz was removed from the card on November 8 after breaking his arm. On November 21, John Lineker was secured as a replacement opponent for Rivera. On December 24, Lineker pulled out of the fight due to a tooth infection that required emergency surgery. After a matchup with former WSOF Bantamweight Champion Marlon Moraes failed to materialize, Rivera was pulled from the event.

Gökhan Saki was scheduled to face Khalil Rountree Jr. at the event. However, Saki was removed from the card on November 28 after sustaining a knee injury. Subsequently, promotional newcomer Michał Oleksiejczuk was secured as his replacement.

A welterweight bout between The Ultimate Fighter: American Top Team vs. Blackzilians welterweight winner Kamaru Usman and Emil Weber Meek was expected to take place at this event. However, due to an alleged visa issue for Meek, the pairing was delayed and rescheduled to take place three weeks later at UFC 220.

A welterweight bout between Abdul Razak Alhassan and Sabah Homasi was originally scheduled for this event, but later shifted to UFC 220. The pairing met previously at UFC 218, when Alhassan won via a controversial TKO.

Results

Bonus awards
The following fighters were awarded $50,000 bonuses:
Fight of the Night: Cris Cyborg vs. Holly Holm
Performance of the Night: Khabib Nurmagomedov and Tim Elliott

Reported payout
The following is the reported payout to the fighters as reported to the Nevada State Athletic Commission. It does not include sponsor money and also does not include the UFC's traditional "fight night" bonuses. The total disclosed payout for the event was $1,795,000.
 Cris Cyborg: $500,000 (no win bonus) def. Holly Holm: $300,000
 Khabib Nurmagomedov: $160,000 (includes $80,000 win bonus) def. Edson Barboza: $75,000
 Dan Hooker: $48,000 (includes $24,000 win bonus) def. Marc Diakiese: $24,000
 Carla Esparza: $72,000 (includes $36,000 win bonus) def. Cynthia Calvillo: $41,000
 Neil Magny: $140,000 (includes $70,000 win bonus) def. Carlos Condit: $115,000 
 Michał Oleksiejczuk: $24,000 (includes $12,000 win bonus) vs. Khalil Rountree Jr.: $19,000
 Myles Jury: $66,000 (includes $33,000 win bonus) def. Rick Glenn: $22,000
 Marvin Vettori: $32,000 drew with Omari Akhmedov: $29,000
 Matheus Nicolau: $28,000 (includes $14,000 win bonus) def. Louis Smolka: $32,000
 Tim Elliott: $56,000 (includes $28,000 win bonus) def. Mark De La Rosa: $12,000

Aftermath
On January 17, it was announced that Calvillo tested positive for marijuana metabolites, stemming from an in-competition sample collected in conjunction with the event.

On January 25, Oleksiejczuk was notified by USADA due to a potential Anti-Doping Policy violation stemming from an in-competition sample collected in conjunction with this event. On June 12, it was announced that he was suspended for one year by USADA. He was already suspended one year in March by the NSAC and his win over Rountree Jr. was overturned to a no contest. The suspensions will run concurrently.

See also
List of UFC events
2017 in UFC
List of current UFC fighters

References

Ultimate Fighting Championship events
Events in Paradise, Nevada
2017 in mixed martial arts
2017 in sports in Nevada
Mixed martial arts in Las Vegas
UFC 219